Joseph Oxenhorn (August 23, 1914October 29, 1989) was an American educator and prolific textbook author. After attending Brooklyn College and receiving a master's degree from Columbia University, he became a teacher and eventually a principal in the New York City school system. Oxenhorn stayed in the city's education system for over 30 years, retiring in 1971. He is noted for having authored 18 science textbooks. His daughter is the political theorist and translator Mera J. Flaumenhaft and his son is the Harvard scholar and author Harvey Oxenhorn. 

He died of prostate cancer in 1989.

Works 
Pathways in Science Series with Michael Norman Idelson (12 vols.), Globe Book Co., 1968
Physics
The Forces of Nature (Vol. 1)
Matter and Energy (Vol. 2)
Sound and Light (Vol. 3)
Earth Science
The Earth We Live On (Vol. 1)
Oceans of Air and Water (Vol. 2)
Energy and Space (Vol. 3)
Biology
The Materials of Life (Vol. 1)
Built for Living (Vol. 2)
The Next Generation (Vol. 3)
Chemistry
The Materials of Nature (Vol. 1)
Chemistry of Mixtures (Vol. 2)
Chemistry of Metals (Vol. 3)
Teaching Science to Underachievers in Secondary Schools, Globe Books Co., 1972
Man and Energy in Space, Globe Book Co., 1975
Oceanography and Our Future, Learning Trends, 1975
Energy and Our Future, Globe Book Co., 1979

Notes 

1914 births
1989 deaths
American school administrators
Schoolteachers from New York (state)
Brooklyn College alumni
Columbia University alumni
20th-century American non-fiction writers
20th-century American educators